= List of ambassadors of Turkey to Burkina Faso =

The list of ambassadors of Turkey to Burkina Faso provides a chronological record of individuals who have served as the diplomatic representatives of the Republic of Turkey to the Republic of Burkina Faso.

== List of ambassadors ==
Ambassador	Term start	Term end	Ref.
Hüsnü Murat Ülkü	30 January 2014	1 November 2014	
Korkut Tufan	1 September 2015	6 June 2017	
Ahmet Asım Arar	9 April 2018	6 November 2020	
Nilgün Erdem Arı	29 April 2021	Present	
